The  A.L.F.A 15 HP is a medium size car produced by A.L.F.A., a company that later became Alfa Romeo, from 1911 to 1913.

The model was derived from the A.L.F.A. 12 HP and had a four-cylinder engine with 2,413 cc of displacement. Compared to the predecessor, the displacement was unchanged, but power output was increased. Bore and stroke were, respectively, . It was a front-engine, rear-wheel-drive car. The 15 HP had a three-speed gearbox, and was equipped with a parking brake. The 15 HP was available in two types of body: torpedo and saloon. It was designed by Giuseppe Merosi and was priced at 9,500 lire.

Notes

Sources

External links 

15andnbsp;HP
Cars introduced in 1911
Brass Era vehicles